Aloys Wenzel, Prince von Kaunitz-Rietberg' (19 June 1774 - 15 November 1848) was a German nobleman and a diplomat of the Austrian Empire.

From the Kaunitz-Rietberg-Questenberg branch of his family, he was the last count of Rietberg, since the county was retained by the Kingdom of Westphalia after the Congress of Vienna. His sister Maria Eleonore (1775-1825) was the first wife of Klemens von Metternich. Born in Vienna, he died in Paris. He served as a diplomat in Dresden, Copenhagen (1801-1804), Naples (1805-1807), Madrid (1815-1817) and the Holy See (1817-1820).

In July 1822 Kaunitz was arrested at his Palace in Vienna and tried after being charged with multiple rapes and pimping. He allegedly had intercourse with hundreds of underage girls mostly members of 
Vienna Children Ballet. Thanks to his powerful relations he was given just house arrest for a while and then exiled in his estate in Moravia.

Bibliography
 Constantin von Wurzbach: Kaunitz, Alois Wenzel Fürst. In: Biographisches Lexikon des Kaiserthums Oesterreich. 11. Theil. Kaiserlich-königliche Hof- und Staatsdruckerei, Wien 1864, S. 63
 Erwin Matsch: Der Auswärtige Dienst von Österreich(-Ungarn) 1720–1920. Böhlau, Wien/Graz 1986, .

References

Diplomats from Vienna
1774 births
1848 deaths
Ambassadors of Austria to the Holy See
Ambassadors of Austria to Spain
Austrian people convicted of child sexual abuse
Grand Crosses of the Order of Saint Stephen of Hungary
Nobility from Vienna